Following is a list of senators of Seine-et-Marne, people who have represented the department of Seine-et-Marne in the Senate of France.

Third Republic

Senators for Seine-et-Marne under the French Third Republic were:

 Gabriel Adam (1876–1885)
 Louis-Alexandre Foucher de Careil (1876–1891)
 François Dufraigne (1885–1891)
 Louis Benoist (1891–1896)
 Jacques Regismanset (1891–1900 and (1903–1923)
 Charles Prévet (1894–1909)
 Jules Bastide (1896–1900)
 Eugène Thomas (1900–1903)
 Edmond Forgemol de Bostquenard (1900–1909)
 François Farny (1909–1919)
 Gaston Menier (1909–1934)
 Eugène Penancier (1920–1936)
 Jules Lugol (1924–1936)
 Jacques-Louis Dumesnil (1935–1940)
 René Courtier (1936–1940)
 Albert Ouvré (1936–1940)

Fourth Republic

Senators for Seine-et-Marne under the French Fourth Republic were:

 Adolphe Legeay (1946-1948
 Hubert Pajot (1946-1958)
 André Bataille (1948-1959)
 Charles Chalamon (1948-1952)
 André Boutemy (1952-1959)
 Pierre Brun (1958-1959) - Reelected in 5th Republic

Fifth Republic 
Senators for Seine-et-Marne under the French Fifth Republic:

References

Sources

 
Lists of members of the Senate (France) by department